The Central African Republic elects on the national level a head of state – the president – and a legislature. The president is elected for a five-year term by the people. The National Assembly (Assemblée Nationale) has 105 members, elected for a five-year term using the two-round (or Run-off) system.

The country has a multi-party system, with two or three strong parties and a third party that is electorally successful.

See also
Electoral calendar
Electoral system
 2020 Central African general election

External links
Adam Carr's Election Archive
African Elections Database
Observatoire National des Elections Civil Society Organisations body monitoring the 2011 elections